Oleksandr Volodymyrovych Pyatov (born 28 July 1996) is a Ukrainian professional footballer who plays as a central midfielder for Polish club Olimpia Zambrów.

References

External links
 Profile on Kryvbas Kryvyi Rih official website
 

1996 births
Living people
People from Pervomaisk, Mykolaiv Oblast
Sportspeople from Mykolaiv Oblast
Ukrainian footballers
Association football midfielders
FC Mykolaiv players
FC Real Pharma Odesa players
FC Myr Hornostayivka players
FC Hirnyk Kryvyi Rih players
FC Kryvbas Kryvyi Rih players
1. SC Znojmo players
Olimpia Zambrów players
Ukrainian First League players
Ukrainian Second League players
Moravian-Silesian Football League players
Ukrainian expatriate footballers
Expatriate footballers in the Czech Republic
Ukrainian expatriate sportspeople in the Czech Republic
Expatriate footballers in Poland
Ukrainian expatriate sportspeople in Poland